The eleventh season of British science fiction television series Doctor Who began on 15 December 1973 with the serial The Time Warrior, and ended with Jon Pertwee's final serial Planet of the Spiders. The season's writing was recognized by the Writer's Guild of Great Britain for Best Children's Drama Script. This is the Third Doctor's fifth and final series, and also the last consecutively to be produced by Barry Letts and script edited by Terrance Dicks. Both Letts and Dicks would work for the programme again, however - Letts in Season 18 and Dicks on future stories, e.g. Horror of Fang Rock.

Casting

Main cast 
 Jon Pertwee as the Third Doctor
 Elisabeth Sladen as Sarah Jane Smith

Jon Pertwee makes his final appearance as the series lead in Planet of the Spiders, although he would reprise the role of the Third Doctor in the 20th anniversary special episode, The Five Doctors. Elisabeth Sladen makes her first appearance as Sarah Jane Smith in The Time Warrior.
Tom Baker makes his first uncredited appearance as the Fourth Doctor in Part 6 of Planet of the Spiders, when Jon Pertwee's Doctor is fatally wounded and regenerates into the Fourth Doctor.

Recurring cast
 Nicholas Courtney as Brigadier Lethbridge-Stewart
 John Levene as Sergeant Benton
 Richard Franklin as Mike Yates

Nicholas Courtney and John Levene continue their roles of Brigadier Lethbridge-Stewart and Sergeant Benton, while Richard Franklin makes his final regular appearance as Captain Yates in Planet of the Spiders

Guest stars
Alan Bennion makes his third and final appearance in the series as an Ice Warrior, portraying Lord Azaxyr in The Monster of Peladon.

Serials 

This season was the last to have Barry Letts as producer and Terrance Dicks as script editor, ending the relationship that had gone through the whole of Jon Pertwee's tenure as the Doctor. It saw the introduction of a new logo that would be used nearly throughout the fourth Doctor's era, as well as the new companion Sarah Jane Smith and the alien race, the Sontarans.

Broadcast
Episode one of The Time Warrior saw the first appearance of the iconic diamond-shaped Doctor Who logo. This would be used throughout the Third Doctor's final season and almost through the Fourth Doctor's tenure before retiring in part four of The Horns of Nimon (not including the unbroadcast and incomplete serial Shada which would have followed The Horns of Nimon).

The entire season was broadcast from 15 December 1973 to 8 June 1974.

Home media

VHS releases

DVD and Blu-ray releases

In print

References

Bibliography 

 
 

1973 British television seasons
1974 British television seasons
Season 11
Season 11
11